No Cover, No Minimum is a live album by Billy Eckstine that was recorded in Las Vegas. The album was released by Roulette in 1960 and reissued by Blue Note in 1992 with ten additional tracks.

Track listing 
 "Have a Song on Me" (Billy Eckstine) - 1:08 
 "I've Grown Accustomed to Her Face" (Alan Jay Lerner, Frederick Loewe) - 2:26 
 "Lady Luck" (Lloyd Price, Harold Logan) - 3:03 
 "Lush Life" (Billy Strayhorn) - 4:04 
 "Without a Song" (Vincent Youmans, Edward Eliscu, Billy Rose) - 2:17 
 "Moonlight in Vermont" (John Blackburn, Karl Suessdorf) - 2:56 
 "I Want a Little Girl" (Billy Moll, Murray Mencher) - 2:02 ‡
 Medley: "Prelude to a Kiss"/"I'm Beginning to See the Light" (Duke Ellington, Irving Mills, Mack Gordon)/(Ellington, Don George,  Johnny Hodges, Harry James) - 4:56 ‡
 "Fools Rush In" (Rube Bloom, Johnny Mercer) - 2:12 ‡
 "In the Still of the Night" (Cole Porter) - 3:41 ‡
 "Prisoner of Love" (Leo Robin, Russ Columbo, Clarence Gaskill) - 1:57 ‡
 "Little Mama" (Eckstine, Sid Kuller) - 3:23 ‡
 "I Apologise" (Eric Nelson, Al Hoffman, Al Goodhart) - 1:57 ‡
 "Till There Was You" (Meredith Willson) - 3:25 ‡
 Medley: "I Let a Song Go Out of My Heart"/"I Got It Bad (and That Ain't Good)" - (Ellington, Mills, Henry Nemo, John Redmond)/(Ellington, Paul Francis Webster) - 6:08 ‡
 "Alright, Okay, You Win" (Sidney Wyche, Mayme Watts) - 3:22 ‡
 "'Deed I Do" (Fred Rose, Walter Hirsch) - 2:21
 "It Might as Well Be Spring" (Richard Rodgers, Oscar Hammerstein II) - 2:44 
 "That's for Me" (Rodgers, Hammerstein) - 2:25
 "You'll Never Walk Alone" (Rodgers, Hammerstein) - 3:20 
 "Misty" (Erroll Garner, Johnny Burke) - 5:07

‡: previously unreleased tracks, from the 1992 reissue.

Personnel 
 Billy Eckstine – vocals, trumpet
 Charlie Walp – trumpet
 Bucky Manieri – trombone
 Buddy Balboa – saxophone
 Charlie McLean – saxophone
 Bobby Tucker – piano, arranger
 Buddy Grievey – drums

Production
 Teddy Reig – producer
 Wally Heider – engineer
 Will Friedwald – liner notes

References

1960 live albums
Billy Eckstine albums
Roulette Records live albums
Albums produced by Teddy Reig
Traditional pop albums